Celmus is an extinct genus from a well-known class of fossil marine arthropods, the trilobites. It lived during the later part of the Arenig stage of the Ordovician Period, approximately 471 to 478 million years ago.

References

Early Ordovician trilobites of Europe
Fossils of Ireland
Proetida